Lennox Head is a seaside village in the Northern Rivers region of New South Wales, Australia, situated on the stretch of coast between Byron Bay and Ballina in Ballina Shire local government area. It had a population of 7,741 in the 2016 Australian census.

Location 
Lennox, as it is frequently called, was once separated from Ballina by some distance. However, the northern encroachment of Ballina and the southern advancement of Lennox Head means that little now separates the two areas.

Geology 

The headland was created in the Cenozoic Era as part of one of the lava flows from the Tweed Volcano, a Shield Volcano, centred on what is now Mount Warning. The basaltic lava spread south and east from the volcano in a succession of flows which covered to varying depths an older landform uplifted from the ocean bed in the Mesozoic Era.

Significant events 

In 1957, a major bushfire which had burned for several days in swamp behind Lennox Head changed direction and swept through the town. Local residents had some warning and sheltered in the space between the lake and the ocean. No houses were lost.

On 3 June 2010, the village was hit by a small Tornado, which severely damaged thirty homes, a number of people were injured and seven vans overturned at the Lake Ainsworth Caravan Park.

In January 2014, a major bushfire broke out just north of the town, igniting heathland all the way north to Suffolk Park. The blaze was started by a lightning strike and continued for another month due to underground peat fires.

Population 
According to the 2016 census of Population, there were 7,741 people in the Lennox Head - Skennars Head area.
 Aboriginal and Torres Strait Islander people made up 1.9% of the population.
 82.0% of people were born in Australia. The most next common countries of birth were England 4.1% and New Zealand 1.8%.
 91.0% of people only spoke English at home.
 The most common responses for religion were No Religion 35.8%, Catholic 25.1% and Anglican 16.0%.

Tourism 
The headland, also known as Lennox Point, is used by surfers, who come for the noted righthand break. Hang-gliders too visit the headland to launch off its 65m cliff. The point is also used for watching dolphins surfing and the annual whale migration. The Pat Morton lookout (at the headland) has views of the village and of Seven Mile Beach extending north towards Broken Head.

The town is known for its pub, caravan park, as well as Lake Ainsworth, a freshwater lake that has distinctive tannin-stained waters from the surrounding tea trees and is in contrasts with the white sands of Seven Mile Beach. Over the warmer summer months the lake is subject to blue green algal bloom.

Also located in the village is a Bora ring of some significance to the local Bundjalung Tribe.

Lennox Head markets are held on the second and fifth Sunday of the month, at the community centre.

The town also has a small primary school (Lennox Head Public School).

Sport and recreation
Lennox Head Dolphins is a rugby league club that competes in the Northern Rivers Regional Rugby League competition.

Lennox Head Rugby Union Club is a rugby union club that competes in the Far North Coast Rugby zone. Known as The Trojans, it was established in 1999. The club’s home ground is Williams Reserve, Lennox Head.

Notable residents
 Pat Rafter – professional tennis player
 Sam Cromack – lead vocalist of Australian indie rock band Ball Park Music, record producer
Simon Baker - Actor

Gallery

References

External links 

 Lennox Head webpage
 
 Lennox Wave

Towns in New South Wales
Surfing locations in New South Wales
Northern Rivers
Coastal towns in New South Wales